Line 1 of the Nanjing Metro is a north-south line and the first operating metro line in the Nanjing Metro system, inaugurated on September 3, 2005.

Opening timeline

Route

This line mainly runs in a north-south direction. It starts at Maigaoqiao station in the north, and continues southwards towards CPU station which is located at the southeastern side of Nanjing.

Of the total 21.72 km of the main line track, 14.33 km of the Line 1 track runs underground, while 7.39 km of the track run on or above the ground. Of the total 16 stations, 11 of them are underground stations while the other 5 are either ground or elevated stations.

The southern extension line of Metro Line 1 has a total length of 25.08 km with 15 stations (excluding Andemen station). Of the total 15 stations, 8 of them are underground and the other 7 are all elevated stations.

The northern extension covers a length of 7.2 km (6.7 km underground and 0.5 km elevated) with 5 underground stations. It's completed in 2022.

Stations

References

External links 
Line 1 on the official Nanjing Metro website (includes route map) 

Nanjing Metro lines
Siemens Mobility projects
Railway lines opened in 2005
2005 establishments in China